Metropolis was a town in ancient Euboea, Greece, mentioned by Stephanus of Byzantium. Its location is not otherwise known.

References

Euboea
Cities in ancient Greece
Lost ancient cities and towns